Mühlbach  is a small stream in Munich-Thalkirchen, Bavaria, Germany. It is a branch of the Isar.

See also
List of rivers of Bavaria

Rivers of Bavaria
0Maria-Einsiedel-Bach
Rivers of Germany